Allyl glycidyl ether is an organic compound used in adhesives and sealants and as a monomer for polymerization reactions.  It is formally the condensation product of allyl alcohol and glycidol via an ether linkage.  Because it contains both an alkene and an epoxide group, either group can be reacted selectively to yield a product where the other functional group remains intact for future reactions.

Preparation
AGE is prepared commercially by the etherification of allyl alcohol with epichlorohydrin. Hydrogen chloride, the byproduct of their condensation, is removed with a base.

AGE can also be synthesized by monoepoxidation of diallyl ether.

Diepoxidation of the second alkene would produce diglycidyl ether.

Allyl glycidyl ether is chiral. Most routes yield a racemic mixture. Epoxidation using monooxygenase enzyme proceeds enantioselectively.

Alternately, nucleophilic cyclization of either chirality of the secondary alcohol onto a primary tosylate gives the chiral epoxide product.

Uses
Allyl glycidyl ether is used in adhesives and sealants and as a monomer for various types of polymer preparations.

Reactions

Polymerization 
As a bifunctional compound, the alkene group or the epoxide group can be reacted selectively to yield a product where the other functional group remains intact for future reactions. For example, either one of them could be used for linear polymerization, and then the other used for cross-linking.

Radical polymerization of the propylene portion in the presence of methyl acrylate yields a block copolymer with a high epoxide content. Similarly, it is can be used in the production of polyvinylcaprolactam as a chain transfer agent.

Nucleophilic polymerization of the epoxide groups gives a material that has the same backbone as polyethylene glycol, with allyl-ether side chains. The additional Lewis basic ether sites alter ion transport in the polymer and also affect the transient inter-chain crosslinking and glass transition temperature in the presence of metal ions. These properties suggest that the material may have applications as an alternative electrolyte for lithium-ion batteries. The alkenes can be elaborated into short polyethylene-glycol oligomers to further increase the ion-binding ability and enhance the resulting material properties.

Block copolymers with ethylene oxide form micelles, which could be useful for encapsulating other molecules as part of a drug delivery system. The alkenes of these macromolecular structures can also be cross-linked via radical polymerization.

Lewis-acid-catalyzed co-polymerisation with carbon dioxide likewise gives a polycarbonate material with allyl side chains that can be further elaborated.

Hydrosilylation 
Rather than polymerization, the alkene group can undergo a hydrosilylation reaction with siloxanes in the presence of chloroplatinic acid as catalyst. Like the polymerization reactions, this reaction also leaves the epoxide intact. By this reaction, allyl glycidyl ether finds use as an intermediate in the production of silane coatings for electrical applications.

See also
 Epoxide
 Glycidol

References

Glycidyl ethers
Allyl compounds